The 2018 Tampere Open was a professional tennis tournament played on clay courts. It was the 37th edition of the tournament which was part of the 2018 ATP Challenger Tour and the 2018 ITF Women's Circuit. It took place in Tampere, Finland, on 23–29 July 2018.

Men's singles main draw entrants

Seeds 

 1 Rankings as of 16 July 2018.

Other entrants 
The following players received wildcards into the singles main draw:
  Harri Heliövaara
  Patrik Niklas-Salminen
  Kenneth Raisma
  Emil Ruusuvuori

The following player received entry into the singles main draw using a protected ranking:
  Riccardo Bellotti

The following player received entry into the singles main draw as a special exempt:
  Kimmer Coppejans

The following players received entry from the qualifying draw:
  Ivan Gakhov
  Tristan Lamasine
  Roberto Marcora
  Jelle Sels

Women's singles main draw entrants

Seeds 

 1 Rankings as of 16 July 2018.

Other entrants 
The following players received wildcards into the singles main draw:
  Ella Haavisto
  Oona Orpana
  Katriin Saar
  Liisa Vehviläinen

The following players received entry from the qualifying draw:
  Alisa Axyanova
  Anda Ghinga
  Emilia Hartman
  Svetlana Iansitova
  Irina Kuzmina-Rimša
  Ana Lantigua de la Nuez
  Mariella Minetti
  Maileen Nuudi

Champions

Men's singles 

 Tallon Griekspoor def.  Juan Ignacio Londero 6–3, 2–6, 6–3.

Women's singles 
  Francesca Jones def.  Bojana Marinković, 6–2, 7–6(7–2)

Men's doubles 

  Markus Eriksson /  André Göransson def.  Ivan Gakhov /  Alexander Pavlioutchenkov 6–3, 3–6, [10–7].

Women's doubles 
  Camila Giangreco Campiz /  Bojana Marinković def.  Polina Bakhmutkina /  Elena Malõgina, 1–6, 6–4, [10–7]

References

External links 
 Official website

2018
Tampere Open
Tampere Open
Tampere Open